is a Japanese actor and voice actor from Fukuoka Prefecture. Some of his most notable projects have been Ranma ½ as Genma Saotome, Mahōjin Guru Guru as Kita Kita Oyaji, Detective Conan as Professor Hiroshi Agasa, Atashin'chi as Father, Inuyasha as Myōga, Kirby: Right Back at Ya! as King Dedede, and the Ganbare Goemon series as Ebisumaru, Boxy & Boat Captain in the You're Under Arrest manga, television and film, respectively. The work in which he voiced the most characters was in the Super Robot Wars series. He used to work at Aoni Production and now is working at Umikaze.

Biography
Kenichi Ogata was born on March 29, 1942. After graduating junior high school, Ogata studied cooking, and then went to high school, where he aimed to be a comedy performer, and worked for some theatrical companies. His voice acting debut was in Mazinger Z, and has been voice acting since.

He is known for his unique soft voice, but also for his astringent and villain roles, and has an established reputation for his role in Tensai Bakabon.

Filmography

Television animation
1970s
Getter Robo (1974) (General Bat)
Great Mazinger (1974) (Ankoku Daishogun, Nuke)
Space Battleship Yamato (1974) (Analyzer)
Getter Robo G (1975) (Hidra)
Grendizer (1975) (Brackky)
Steel Jeeg (1975) (Ikima, Kurowashi no Don)
Gansou Tensai Bakabon (1975) (Nyarome, Thief, Weather Forecaster, Dog of Flanders, additional voices)
 Combattler V (1976) (Girua, Dangeru)
 Gaiking (1976) (Hayami Bunta)
 Wakusei Robo Danguard Ace (1977) (Gudon, Rugā)
 Captain Future (1978) (Grag)
 Captain Harlock (1978) (Chief Engineer Maji)
 Mobile Suit Gundam (1979) (Denim)
1980s
Kaibutsu-kun (1980) (Nonbirasu)
Maeterlinck's Blue Bird: Tyltyl and Mytyl's Adventurous Journey (1980) (Spirit of Fire)
Space Emperor God Sigma (1980) (Maruchīno)
The Wonderful Adventures of Nils (1980) (Lasse)
Ninja Hattori-kun (1981) (Shishimaru)
Fang of the Sun Dougram (1981) (Nanashi)
Urusei Yatsura (1981) (Ataru's father)
Combat Mecha Xabungle (1982) (Kashim King)
Game Center Arashi (1982) (Ippeita)
Armored Trooper Votoms (1983) (Boror)
Igano Kabamaru (1983) (Saizō Igano)
Chikkun Takkun (1984) (Gijigiji)
Sei Jūshi Bismark (1984) (Gustav)
Ai Shoujo Pollyanna Monogatari (1986) (Tom)
Anmitsu Hime (1986) (Wantan)
Uchūsen Sagittarius (1986) (Rana)
Bubblegum Crisis (1987) (Doctor Raven)
Kimagure Orange Road (1987) (Jingoro, Kyosuke's grandfather)
Anpanman (1988) (Hedoroman)
Osomatsu-kun (1988) (Shinigami, understudy for Dayōn in episodes 80-83 and Kemunpasu)
The Burning Wild Man (1988). (Kenkichi Kokuhō)
Mashin Hero Wataru (1988) (Genryūsai Shinobibe, Doctor cosmo)
Alfred J. Kwak (1989) (Henk)
Lupin III: Bye-Bye Liberty Crisis (1989) (Ed)
Guyver (1989) (Genzō Makishima/Enzyme)
The Adventures of Peter Pan (1989) (Smee)
Ranma ½ (1989) (Genma Saotome)
1990s
 Kyatto Ninden Teyandee (1990) (Nekomata Reikainosuke)
 Magical Angel Sweet Mint (1990) (Vinegar)
 Watashi no Ashinaga Ojisan (1990) (George)
 Robin Hood no Daibōken (1990) (Friar Tuck)
 The Three-Eyed One (1990) (Ban Shunsaku)
Tasuke, the Samurai Cop (1990) (School Director)
 The Bush Baby (1992) (Kurankushou)
 YuYu Hakusho (1992) (Tarukane)
 Nintama Rantarou (1993) (Shinbei's papa)
 Mahōjin Guru Guru (1994) (Udberg "Kita Kita Oyaji" Eldol)
Nanatsu no Umi no Tico (1994) (Alphonse Aldretti)
Tenchi Universe (1995) (Azaka, both Guardian and Knight)
 Detective Conan (1996) (Professor Hiroshi Agasa)
 Rurouni Kenshin (1996) (Heizo Ogawa)
 Midori no Makibaō (1996) (Genjirou)
 Those Who Hunt Elves (1996) (Pierre)
 Anime Ganbare Goemon (1997) (Ebisumaru)
Flame of Recca (1997) (Kokū)
Lupin III: In Memory of the Walther P-38 (1997) (Bomū)
The King of Braves GaoGaiGar (1997) (Leo Shishio, Liger Shishio, Pasdar)
Pokémon (1997) (John, Rohho, village headman)
You're Under Arrest (1997) (Boxy)
Cyber Team in Akihabara (1998) (Shimabukurō Sengakuji)
Dokkiri Doctor (1998) (Rokoro Shibuya)
Sexy Commando Gaiden: Sugoiyo! Masaru-san (1998) (Bosu)
Excel Saga (1999) (Aesop)
One Piece (1999) (Gorōsei, Gancho)
2000s
Inuyasha (2000) (Myōga)
UFO Baby (2000) (Housho Sayonji)
Vandread: The Second Stage (2000) (Taraak Elder)
Lupin III: Alcatraz Connection (2001) (Areji)
Kirby: Right Back at Ya! (2001) (King Dedede)
Shaman King (2001) (Shamon)
Atashin'chi (2002) (Father)
Bomberman Jetters (2002) (Doctor Ein)
MegaMan NT Warrior (2002) (TopMan)
Pokémon Advanced Generation (2002) (Tessen)
Dokkoida (2003) (Kurisaburou Kurinohara, Doctor Marron Flower)
Sgt. Frog (2004) (Keroro's father)
Blood+ (2005) (Ted A. Adams)
Doraemon (2005) (Sensei Funyako)
MÄR (2005) (Vidar)
Aria the Natural (2006) (Maestro)
Binchō-tan (2006) (Madake-jiichan)
Gintama (2006) (Santa)
The Melancholy of Haruhi Suzumiya (2006) (Shamisen)
Nana (2006) (Andou)
The Third (2006) (Noru)
Juushin Enbu Hero Tales (2007) (Sonnei)
To Love-Ru (2008) (Principal)
Fresh Pretty Cure! (2009) (Chorō Tiramisu)
Chi's New Address (2009) (Fuji)
2010s
Yugioh Zexal! (2011) (Jinlong)
In Search of the Lost Future (2014) (Mitsunori Ogawa)
Nobunaga Concerto (2014) (Takugen)
Nisekoi (2014) (Issei Ichijo)
Comical Psychosomatic Medicine (2015) (Sukizō Kangoshi)
My Hero Academia (2017) (Gran Torino)
Altair: A Record of Battles" (2017) (Şehir Halil)
Radiant (2018) (Santori)
The Rising of the Shield Hero (2019) (Beloukas "The Slave Trader")
2020s
Dragon Quest: The Adventure of Dai (2020) (Brass)
Yashahime: Princess Half-Demon (2020) (Myōga)
Getter Robo Arc (2021) (Professor Han)
Irina: The Vampire Cosmonaut (2021) (Fjodor Gergiev)
The Devil Is a Part-Timer!! (2022) (Camio)
Detective Conan: The Culprit Hanzawa (2022) (Professor Hiroshi Agasa)
Giant Beasts of Ars (2023) (Zen)
Too Cute Crisis (2023) (Mikiti Furupururin)

Original video animation (OVA)
Dangaioh (1987) (Captain Garimoth)
Wicked City (1987) (Male Co-Worker)
Gosenzo-sama Banbanzai! (1989) (Kinekuni Yomota)
Legend of the Galactic Heroes (1989) (Marinesk)
Adventure Kid (1992) (Doctor Masago)
Dragon Half (1993) (King Siva)
Mega Man: Upon a Star (1993) (Dr. Wily)
Final Fantasy: Legend of the Crystals (1994) (Ra Devil)
Venus 5 (1994) (Buccha)
Saber Marionette R (1997) (Ojiji)
The King of Braves GaoGaiGar Final (2000) (Leo Shishio)
Apocalypse Zero (2010) (High school principal, Kagenari)
Various dates
Ranma ½ OVA (Genma Saotome)

Original net animation (ONA)
Comical Psychosomatic Medicine (2015) (Sukizō Kangoshi)

Theatrical animation
Lupin III: Legend of the Gold of Babylon (1985) (Sam)
MAROKO (1990) (Kinekuni Yomota)
Doraemon: Nobita and the Tin Labyrinth (1993) (Nejirin Captain)
Memories (1995) (Omaeda)
Mahojin Guru Guru (1996) (Udberg "Kita Kita Oyaji" Eldol)Violinist of Hameln (1996) (Bass)Crayon Shin-chan: The Storm Called: The Battle of the Warring States (2002) (Niemon)Dobutsu no Mori (2006) (Kotobuki)

Various datesInuyasha series (Myōga the Flea)Space Battleship Yamato series (Analyzer)Urusei Yatsura series (Ataru's father) You're Under Arrest The Movie (Boat Captain) 1999

Video gamesApe Escape 2 and 3 (Ukki White)Arc the Lad (Chongara)Blue Dragon (Fūshira)Brave Fencer Musashi (Tekīra)Crash Bandicoot (Aku Aku)Crash Bandicoot: Warped (Aku Aku)Crash Bandicoot: The Wrath of Cortex (Aku Aku)Crash Bandicoot 2: Cortex Strikes Back (Aku Aku)Crash Bandicoot 4: It's About Time (Aku Aku)Crash Bash (Aku Aku)Crash Nitro Kart (Aku Aku)Crash Team Racing (Aku Aku)Crash Twinsanity (Aku Aku)Devil Kings (Shimazu Yoshihiro) Everybody's Golf (Stud)Ganbare Goemon (Ebisumaru)God of War III (Poseidon)Harry Potter and the Philosopher's Stone (Filius Flitwick)
Inuyasha (Myōga)
Inuyasha: The Secret of the Cursed Mask (Myōga)
Mana-Khemia 2: Ochita Gakuen to Renkinjutsushi-tachi (Gotou)
Mega Man Legends (Barrell Caskett)
Mega Man Legends 2 (Barrell Caskett)
Mobile Suit Gundam Battlefield Record U.C. 0081 (Bob Rock)
Mobile Suit Gundam Side Story 0079: Rise from the Ashes (Bob Rock)
Power Stone (Aporusu)
Puyo Puyon (Skeleton T)
Radiata Stories (Jasune Colton)
Ranma ½ (Genma Saotome)
Sengoku Basara: Battle Heroes (Shimazu Yoshihiro)
Sengoku Basara: Samurai Heroes (Shimazu Yoshihiro)
Sengoku Basara 2 (Shimazu Yoshihiro)
Sengoku Basara 4 (Shimazu Yoshihiro)
Skylanders: Giants (Pop Fizz)
Space Battleship Yamato series (Analyzer)
Steambot Chronicles (Nutmeg)
Suikoden V (Galleon)
Time Leap (Grandfather)
Wild Arms Alter Code: F (Aruhazādo)
The Wonderful 101 (James Shirogane)

Live-action roles
Space Battleship Yamato (2010) (voice of Analyzer)
Daddy Sister (2016)
Segodon (2018) (Nakayama Tadayasu)
Awaiting Kirin (2020) (Monk)
The 13 Lords of the Shogun (2022) (Chief priest of Ganjōju-in)

Dubbing roles

Live Action
Ace Ventura: When Nature Calls (Fulton Greenwall (Ian McNeice))
Breakfast at Tiffany's (Nippon Television Edition) (Mr. Yunioshi)
Butch Cassidy and the Sundance Kid (2013 Star Channel/On-Demand Dub)  (Percy Garris)
Casper (1998 NTV Dub) (Stretch)
Clifford the Big Red Dog (Mr. Bridwell (John Cleese))
Ewoks: The Battle for Endor (Noa)
Die Hard 2 (1992 Fuji TV edition) (Leslie Barnes)
The Exterminator (1981 Fuji TV Dub) (The State Senator from New Jersey)
Full House (Lou, shop manager)
Gremlins 2: The New Batch (DVD and 1994 TV Asahi Dubs) (Brain Gremlin)
History of the World, Part I (1992 TV Asahi Dub) (Caesar, Swiftus)
Indiana Jones and the Last Crusade (Fuji TV edition) (Sallah)
Johnny Dangerously (1991 NTV Dub) (Burr)
Jumanji (1998 Fuji TV Edition) (Hunter Van Pelt)
The Lord of the Rings: The Fellowship of the Ring (Barliman Butterbur)
Pippi Longstocking (Thunder-Karlsson)
Police Academy 2: Their First Assignment (Zed) (1988 Fuji TV Dub)
Police Academy 3: Back in Training (Zed) (1988 TBS Dub)
Police Academy 4: Citizens on Patrol (Zed) (1989 TBS Dub)
Quincy, M.E. (Lieutenant Frank Monahan)
Rocky IV (Duke)
She-Wolf of London (PC Leary (Richard Coleman))
The Sting (DVD edition) (FBI Agent Polk)
Teenage Mutant Ninja Turtles II: The Secret of the Ooze (Professor Jordan Perry)
V (Nippon TV edition) (Willie)
Wayne's World (Noah Vanderhoff)

Animation
Animaniacs (Brain)
Arthur Christmas (Grandsanta)
Barnyard (Otis and Ben)
Back at the Barnyard (Otis)
The Brave Little Toaster (Black and White TV)
Dinosaurs (Gus)
DuckTales (Bigtime Beagle)
Pinky and the Brain (Brain)
The Secret of NIMH (Sullivan)
Star Wars: Ewoks (Chirpa)
Who Framed Roger Rabbit (Marvin Acme and Porky Pig and  Woody Woodpecker)
O'Faby (Police officer)

Japanese Voice-Over
Splash Mountain (Br'er Vulture 1)
X-Bomber (Dr. Gedora)

Awards

References

External links
 Official agency profile 
 Kenichi Ogata at GamePlaza-Haruka Voice Acting Database 
 Kenichi Ogata at Hitoshi Doi's Seiyuu Database 
 
Maeda, Hisashi. "The Official Art of The Melancholy of Haruhi Suzumiya". (November 2007) Newtype USA. pp. 133–139.

1942 births
Living people
Aoni Production voice actors
Japanese male musical theatre actors
Japanese male video game actors
Japanese male voice actors
Male voice actors from Fukuoka Prefecture
Production Baobab voice actors
20th-century Japanese male actors
21st-century Japanese male actors